Below is a list of the 25 members of the European Parliament for the Netherlands in the 1989 to 1994 session.

Party representation

Mutations

1989 
 15 June: Election for the European Parliament in the Netherlands.
 24 July: Begin 3rd European Parliament session. (1989–1994)
 6 November: Hanja Maij-Weggen (CDA) leaves the European Parliament, because he became a minister in the Third Lubbers cabinet.
 7 November: Hedy d'Ancona (PvdA) leaves the European Parliament, because he became a minister in the Third Lubbers cabinet.
 7 November: Piet Dankert (PvdA)  leaves the European Parliament, because he became an Undersecretary in the Third Lubbers cabinet.
 20 November: Bartho Pronk (CDA) is installed in the European Parliament as a replacement for Hanja Maij-Weggen.
 20 November: Mathilde van den Brink and Annemarie Goedmakers both from the Labour Party are installed in the European Parliament as a replacement for Hedy d'Ancona and Piet Dankert.

Alphabetical

| style="text-align:left;" colspan="11" | 
|-
! Name
! Sex
! National party
! EP Group
! Period
! Preference vote
|-align=left
| Hedy d'Ancona
| Female
|  Labour Party
|  SOC
| 24 July 1984 – 7 November 1989
|
|-align=left
| Jan-Willem Bertens
| Male
|  Democrats 66
|  LDR
| 24 July 1989 – 20 July 1999
|
|-align=left
| Bouke Beumer
| Male
|  Christian Democratic Appeal
|  EPP
| 17 July 1979 – 19 July 1994
|
|-align=left
| Mathilde van den Brink
| Female
|  Labour Party
|  SOC
| 20 November 1989 – 19 July 1994
|
|-align=left
| Pam Cornelissen
| Male
|  Christian Democratic Appeal
|  EPP
| 24 July 1984 – 20 July 1999
|
|-align=left
| Piet Dankert
| Male
|  Labour Party
|  SOC
| 17 July 1979 – 7 November 1989
|
|-align=left
| Nel van Dijk
| Female
|  Communist Party of the Netherlands
|  RBW
| January 1987 – 1 September 1998
|
|-align=left
| Annemarie Goedmakers
| Female
|  Labour Party
|  SOC
| 20 November 1989 – 19 July 1994
|
|-align=left
| Jim Janssen van Raaij
| Male
|  Christian Democratic Appeal
|  EPP
| 17 July 1979 – 24 July 1984October 1986 – 20 July 1999 
| 
|-align=left
| Jessica Larive
| Female
|  People's Party for Freedom and Democracy
|  LDR
| 24 July 1984 – 20 July 1999
|
|-align=left
| Hanja Maij-Weggen
| Female
|  Christian Democratic Appeal
|  EPP
| 17 July 1979 – 6 November 1989
|
|-align=left
| Alman Metten
| Male
|  Labour Party
|  SOC
| 24 July 1984 – 20 July 1999
|
|-align=left
| Hemmo Muntingh
| Male
|  Labour Party
|  SOC
| 17 July 1979 – 19 July 1994
|
|-align=left
| Ria Oomen-Ruijten
| Female
|  Christian Democratic Appeal
|  EPP
| 25 July 1989 – 1 July 2014
|
|-align=left
| Arie Oostlander
| Male
|  Christian Democratic Appeal
|  EPP
| 25 July 1989 – 20 July 2004
|
|-align=left
| Karla Peijs
| Female
|  Christian Democratic Appeal
|  EPP
| 25 July 1989 – 27 May 2003
|
|-align=left
| Jean Penders
| Male
|  Christian Democratic Appeal
|  EPP
| 17 July 1979 – 19 July 1994
|
|-align=left
| Bartho Pronk
| Male
|  Christian Democratic Appeal
|  EPP
| 20 November 1989 – 20 July 2004
|
|-align=left
| Maartje van Putten
| Female
|  Labour Party
|  SOC
| 25 July 1989 – 20 July 1999
|
|-align=left
| Jan Sonneveld
| Male
|  Christian Democratic Appeal
|  EPP
| 25 July 1989 – 20 July 1999
|
|-align=left
| Wim van Velzen
| Male
|  Labour Party
|  SOC
| 25 July 1989 – 20 July 1999
|
|-align=left
| Herman Verbeek
| Male
|  Political Party of Radicals
|  RBW
| 25 July 1989 – 19 July 1994
|
|-align=left
| Maxime Verhagen
| Male
|  Christian Democratic Appeal
|  EPP
| 25 July 1989 – 19 July 1994
|
|-align=left
| Ben Visser
| Male
|  Labour Party
|  SOC
| 24 July 1984 – 19 July 1994
|
|-align=left
| Gijs de Vries
| Male
|  People's Party for Freedom and Democracy
|  LDR
| 24 July 1984 – 2 August 1998
|
|-align=left
| Leen van der Waal
| Male
|  Reformed Political Party
|  NI
| 24 July 1984 – 2 September 1997
|
|-align=left
| Florus Wijsenbeek
| Male
|  People's Party for Freedom and Democracy
|  LDR
| 24 July 1984 – 20 July 1999
|
|-align=left
| Eisso Woltjer
| Male
|  Labour Party
|  SOC
| 17 July 1979 – 19 July 1994
|
|-style="background-color:#dcdcdc"
|align=left colspan="6"|Source:
|-
|}

By party

On the Christian Democratic Appeal list: (EPP)

 Bouke Beumer
 Pam Cornelissen
 Jim Janssen van Raaij
 Hanja Maij-Weggen (replaced by: Bartho Pronk)
 Ria Oomen-Ruijten
 Arie Oostlander
 Karla Peijs
 Jean Penders (top candidate)
 Jan Sonneveld
 Maxime Verhagen
Bartho Pronk

On the Labour Party list: (SOC)

 Hedy d'Ancona (replaced by: Mathilde van den Brink)
 Piet Dankert (top candidate) (replaced by: Annemarie Goedmakers)
 Alman Metten
 Hemmo Muntingh
 Maartje van Putten
 Wim van Velzen
 Ben Visser
 Eisso Woltjer
 Mathilde van den Brink
 Annemarie Goedmakers

On the People's Party for Freedom and Democracy list: (LDR)

 Jessica Larive
 Gijs de Vries (top candidate)
 Florus Wijsenbeek

On the Rainbow (ppr-psp-cpn-evp-gpn-indep.) list: (RBW)

 Nel van Dijk (CPN)
 Herman Verbeek (PPR) (top candidate)

On the Democrats 66 list: (LDR)

 Jan-Willem Bertens (top candidate)

On the SGP, GPV and RPF list: (NI)

 Leen van der Waal (SGP) (top candidate)

References 

Netherlands
List
1989